"There'll Be Peace in the Valley for Me" is a 1939 song written by Thomas A. Dorsey, originally for Mahalia Jackson. It was copyrighted by Dorsey under this title on January 25, 1939, though it often appears informally as "Peace in the Valley". 

The song was a hit in 1951 for Red Foley and the Sunshine Boys, reaching number seven on the Country & Western Best Seller chart. It was among the first gospel recordings to sell one million copies. Foley's version was a 2006 entry into the Library of Congress' National Recording Registry.

Elvis Presley's performance
The song achieved mass coverage during Elvis Presley's third and final appearance on The Ed Sullivan Show on January 6, 1957. Before an audience estimated at 54.6 million viewers, Presley closed the show by dedicating the song to the 250,000 refugees fleeing Hungary after the 24 and 31 October 1956 double-invasion of that country by the Soviet Union. Because he also requested that immediate aid be sent to lessen their plight, the appeal in turn yielded contributions amounting to US$6 million, or the equivalent of US$49.5 million in today's money. Over the next 11 months, the International Red Cross in Geneva, with the help of the US Air Force, organized the distribution of both perishables and non-perishables purchased with the above-mentioned funds (Swiss Francs 26.2 million, at the then 4.31 CHFR-US$ exchange) to the refugees in both Austria and England where they settled for life. On October 15, 1957, Presley's first Christmas album, containing a master studio recording of the song, was released, topping the Billboard Charts for four weeks and selling in excess of three million copies, as certified by the RIAA on July 15, 1999. Because of these  developments, István Tarlós, the Mayor of the city of Budapest, in 2011 and as a gesture of belated gratitude, named a park after him, as well as making him an honorary citizen.

Other recordings
Eventually, the song became a country-pop favorite and was recorded by:
In 1950, it was one of the first songs recorded by a young Sam Cooke, during his tenure as lead singer of the Soul Stirrers.
After the success of Red Foley's interpretation, Jo Stafford recorded the song for her 1954 gospel album Garden of Prayer.
Little Richard on his 1961 Quincy Jones-produced gospel album The King of the Gospel Singers
Connie Francis on her 1961 album Sing Along with Connie Francis
George Jones on his 1962 album Homecoming in Heaven
Johnny Cash on his 1969 At San Quentin live album (he recorded the studio version in 1962 and released it as a single) 
Loretta Lynn
Dolly Parton
Screaming Trees, as a B-side to their "Dollar Bill" single
Ronnie Milsap
Art Greenhaw with the Jordanaires
Tom Brumley, and the Light Crust Doughboys for the Grammy Award nominated album starring Ann-Margret titled God Is Love:  The Gospel Sessions; 
Faith Hill, performed it for a concert special.
A3 featuring Errol Thompson, on the A Life Less Ordinary Soundtrack (1997)

Popular culture
"Peace in the Valley" was sung by Eddie Clendening, portraying Elvis Presley, in the Broadway musical Million Dollar Quartet, which opened in New York in April 2010.  Eddie Clendening also covered the song on the Million Dollar Quartet original Broadway cast album.

References

External links
"Peace in the Valley" at allmusic 
"Peace in the Valley" at CBN

Gospel songs
Johnny Cash songs
Elvis Presley songs
Jo Stafford songs
1939 songs
Red Foley songs
Songs written by Thomas A. Dorsey
Mahalia Jackson songs
United States National Recording Registry recordings